Anthrax cascadensis is a species of bee flies (insects in the family Bombyliidae).

Distribution
Canada, United States.

References

Bombyliidae
Insects described in 1963
Diptera of North America